"I Need a Girl (Part Two)" is a single by American rapper P. Diddy. It was released on May 21, 2002 as the second single from Diddy's and Bad Boy Records' remix album, We Invented the Remix (2002). It is a sequel to the single "I Need a Girl (Part One)", released a few months prior. The song includes guest appearances from Ginuwine, Loon, Mario Winans and Tammy Ruggeri. It was written by Sean Combs, Chauncey Hawkins, Mario Winans, Frankie Romano, Michael Carlos Jones and Adonis Shropshire and produced by Mario Winans and Diddy. Just like with I Need A Girl (Part One), the music video was directed by Benny Boom.

"Part Two" peaked at number four on the US Billboard Hot 100 and number two on the Billboard Hot Rap Tracks chart. It also charted on the UK Singles Chart at number four. With the song's success on the charts, P. Diddy achieved the rare occurrence of having both parts of the song become big hits.

Background
It samples P. Diddy's line "Now the Sun don't shine for ever, but as long as it's here then we might as well shine together" from his 1997 song "Victory" featuring The Notorious B.I.G. and Busta Rhymes from his debut album No Way Out (1997), released under the stage name Puff Daddy.

Sequels
On February 17, 2012, Mario Winans and German rapper Kay One released a "Part Three" to the song. In Germany, "Part Three" peaked at number 29.

A female-themed equivalent of the song was released by Dani and Phaedra, titled "I'm That Girl".

Tyga recorded a part three from the song on his 2018 album Kyoto.

Diddy’s later collaboration with Ozuna and DJ Snake, "Eres Top" (from Ozuna’s Nibiru album), samples the main instrumental hook from "I Need A Girl (Part Two)".

Track listing
CD-Maxi

Charts

Weekly charts

Year-end charts

Certifications

References

External links
BMI songwriter info

2002 singles
Sean Combs songs
Bad Boy Records singles
Songs written by Sean Combs
Songs written by Adonis Shropshire
Songs written by Mario Winans
Sequel songs
Songs written by Loon (rapper)